Víctor Guardia Quirós (September 16, 1873  – November 2, 1959) was a Costa Rican lawyer and writer.

20th-century Costa Rican judges
Costa Rican male writers
1873 births
1959 deaths
Supreme Court of Justice of Costa Rica judges